Georgius Perpignani (1555–1621) was a Roman Catholic prelate who served as Bishop of Canea (1619–1621) and Bishop of Tinos (1594–1619).

Biography
Georgius Perpignani was born in Crete in 1555.
On 14 November 1594, he was appointed during the papacy of Pope Clement VIII as Bishop of Tinos.
On 20 November 1594, he was consecrated bishop by Gianfrancesco Morosini, Bishop of Brescia, with Flaminio Filonardi, Bishop of Aquino, and Leonard Abel, Titular Bishop of Sidon, serving as co-consecrators. 
On 15 July 1619, he was appointed during the papacy of Pope Paul V as Bishop of Canea.
He served as Bishop of Canea until his death in 1621. 
While bishop, he was the principal co-consecrator of Juan Orozco Covarrubias y Leiva, Bishop of Agrigento.

References

External links and additional sources
 (for Chronology of Bishops) 
 (for Chronology of Bishops) 

16th-century Roman Catholic bishops in the Republic of Venice
17th-century Roman Catholic bishops in the Republic of Venice
Bishops appointed by Pope Clement VIII
Bishops appointed by Pope Paul V
1555 births
1621 deaths